The Treaty of Peace and Friendship of 1984 between Chile and Argentina (see the text in the United Nations) was signed into agreement at the Vatican on 29 November 1984.

It was ratified
 on 30 December 1984 by the Argentine Chamber of Deputies;
 on 15 March 1985 by the Argentine National Congress;
 on 16 March 1985 by the Interim representative of the President of Argentina, who was abroad;
 on 11 April 1985 by the Chilean Military Government Junta as Legislature.

On 12 April 1985 it was signed by Augusto Pinochet, and on 2 May 1985 the Foreign Ministers of both countries exchanged original documents. Due to the timing, the treaty is variously known as the 1984 Treaty or the 1985 Treaty.

The treaty contains a preamble, a maritime border definition, a comprehensive body of legislation on solving disputes, ship navigation rights and an exact definition of the border through the Straits of Magellan.
Chile and Argentina, though never at war with each other, have named some of their border treaties as "peace treaties".

Genesis of the treaty
The treaty ended the Beagle conflict and was the result of long-standing negotiations between Chile, Argentina and the Vatican as mediator. The outcome of the Falklands war made the treaty possible.<ref>"A history of Chile, 1808–1994" de Simon Collier and William F. Sater, Cambridge University Press, aquí, p. 364:
 "Argentina's defeat by Great Britain in the brief Falklands War (April–June 1982) – during which Chile gave descreet and totally unpublicized assistance to the British – dispelled the prospect of further military adventures from that quarter."</ref> When consulted in a non-binding referendum on resolving the conflict by then-President Raul Alfonsin, 82% of Argentine population voted in favor of signing the treaty.

The Preamble

The treaty recognizes the Boundary Treaty of 1881 between Chile and Argentina and its «…supplementary and declaratory instruments…» as the unshakeable foundation of relations between Chile and Argentina and defines the border «…from the end of the existing boundary in the Beagle Channel, i.e., the point fixed by the coordinates 55°07.3' South latitude and 66°25.0' West longitude…» (Bold by Wikipedia). That is, Argentina recognizes the borderline determined by the Beagle Channel Arbitration in 1977 (Report and Decision of the Court of Arbitration), which it had earlier rejected. Hence, there is no mention of Picton, Nueva, Lennox and other islands. The Treaty calls its content a Transaction.

Excepting articles 1 to 6, which define a comprehensive body of legislation regarding dispute resolution, the other provisions shall not affect in any way, nor may they be interpreted in any way, that can affect, directly or indirectly, the sovereignty, rights, juridical positions of the Parties, or the boundaries in Antarctica or in its adjacent maritime areas, including the seabed and subsoil.

The maritime border

The international maritime border is the line ABCDEF. Westward are Chilean waters; eastward are Argentine waters.

Both countries mutually recognized its baselines. (The Chilean Baseline can be seen here.) From the Cape Horn Meridian (67°16',0 West) to the east end of the Isla de los Estados both countries reduced their internal waters to  only in their mutual relations.

The line ABCDEF gives most of the exclusive economic zone of the islands (eastwards of Cape Horn) previously in dispute to Argentina. On the map, the gray line is approximately equidistant between the shores of Chile and Argentina. Such an equidistant line is normally how maritime borders are drawn between two countries, though this approach is not compulsory.

Navigation rights
Vessels of all nations in traffic between the Straits of Magellan and Argentine ports in the Beagle Channel, and vice versa, enjoy navigation facilities exclusively along the following route through Chilean internal waters: Magdalena Channel, Canal Cockburn, Paso Brecknock or Canal Occasion, Canal Ballenero, Canal O'Brien, Paso Timbales, northwest arm of the Beagle Channel and the Beagle Channel as far as the meridian 68°36'38.5" West longitude and vice versa. The passage shall be navigated with a Chilean pilot and the Chilean Authority shall be informed at least 48 hours in advance of the date on which the vessel will begin passage.

For maritime traffic between Argentine ports in the Beagle Channel and the Argentine Exclusive Economic Zone (or Antarctic), and vice versa, Argentine vessels shall enjoy navigation facilities for the passage through Chilean internal waters exclusively via the following route: Paso Picton and Paso Richmond, then following from a point fixed by the coordinates 55'21.0' South latitude and 66'41.0" West longitude, the general direction of the arc between true 090' and 180', emerging in the Chilean territorial sea; or crossing the Chilean territorial sea in the general direction of the arc between true 270' and 000', and continuing through Paso Richmond and Paso Picton. The passage may be effected without a Chilean pilot and without notice.

For maritime traffic to and from the north through the Le Maire Strait, Chilean vessels shall enjoy navigation facilities for the passage of that strait, without an Argentine pilot and without notice.

The Strait of Magellan
The Straits of Magellan belong, since the Treaty of 1881, to Chile, The Straits are a demilitarized zone and free for navigation for vessels of all countries.

New in respect thereof is that the Argentine Republic undertakes to maintain, at any time and in whatever circumstances, the right of ships of all flags to navigate expeditiously and without obstacles through its jurisdictional waters to and from the Straits of Magellan.

The Parties give mutual recognition to the baselines which they have traced in their respective territories. That is, regarding the Straits of Magellan, Argentina recognizes that the Straits of Magellan have no delta at the western end and that the Channels Abra, Magdalena, Cockburn and others are Chilean internal waters as defined by the Chilean baselines and that they are not free for navigation.

The parties agree that at the eastern end of the Straits of Magellan, defined by Punta Dúngeness in the north and Cabo del Espiritu Santo in the south, the boundary between their respective sovereignties shall be the straight line joining the "Dungeness Marker (Former Beacon)", located at the very tip of the said geographical feature, and "Marker I on Cabo del Espiritu Santo" in Tierra del Fuego. The sovereignty of Chile and Argentina over the sea, seabed and subsoil shall extend, respectively, to the west and east of this boundary. This commitment ends any Chilean projection over the Atlantic and any Argentine pretension to coregulate traffic in the Straits of Magellan.

Dispute resolution
The parties reiterate solemnly their commitment to preserve, strengthen and develop their unchanging ties of perpetual friendship and to refrain from resorting directly or indirectly to any form of threat or use of force and from adopting any other measures which may disturb the peace in any sector of their mutual relations.

They create a Conciliation Commission and, if it fails, eventually an Arbitral Tribunal. The decision of the tribunal shall be binding on the Parties, final and unappealable. Its implementation shall be entrusted to the honour of the nations signing the Treaty of Peace and Friendship.

The Argentine decree 256/2010
On 17 February 2010 the Argentine executive issued the decree 256/2010 pertaining to authorisation requirements placed on shipping to and from Argentina but also to ships going through Argentine jurisdictional water heading for ports situated in the Falkland Islands, South Georgia and South Sandwich Islands. This decree was implemented by disposition 14/2010 of the Argentine Naval Prefecture. On 19 May 2010 the United Kingdom presented a note verbale rejecting the Argentine government's decree and disposition, saying that they "are not  with International Law including the UN Convention on the Law of the Sea", and with respect to the Straits of Magellan the note recalls that "the rights of international shipping to navigate these waters expeditiously and without obstacle are affirmed in the 1984 Treaty of Peace and Friendship between Chile and Argentina with respect to the Straits of Magellan".

Article 10 of the 1984 Treaty states "The Argentine Republic undertakes to maintain, at any time and in whatever circumstances, the right of ships of all flags to navigate expeditiously and without obstacles through its jurisdictional waters to and from the Strait of Magellan".

See also
 Boundary treaty of 1881 between Chile and Argentina
 Argentina-Chile relations
 Foreign relations of Argentina
 Foreign relations of Chile

References

Literature
 Beagle Channel Arbitration between the Republic of Argentina and the Republic of Chile, Report and Decision of the Court of Arbitration
 Mark Laudy: The Vatican Mediation of the Beagle Channel Dispute: Crisis Intervention and Forum Building in Words Over War of Carnegie Commission on Preventing Deadly Conflict.
 Alejandro Luis Corbacho: Predicting the Probability of War During Brinkmanship Crises: The Beagle and the Malvinas Conflicts, Universidad del CEMA, Argentina,  Documento de Trabajo No. 244, September 2003, Spanish
 Karin Oellers-Frahm: Der Schiedsspruch in der Beagle-Kanal-Streitigkeit, Berichte und Urkunden: Max-Planck-Institut für ausländisches öffentliches Recht und Völkerrecht, German
 Ministerio de Relaciones Exteriores de Chile: Relaciones Chileno-Argentinas, La controversia del Beagle. Genf 1979, English and Spanish
 Andrea Wagner: Der argentinisch-chilenische Konflikt um den Beagle-Kanal. Ein Beitrag zu den Methoden friedlicher Streiterledigung. Verlag Peter Lang, Frankfurt a.M. 1992, German
 Karl Hernekamp: Der argentinisch-chilenisch Grenzstreit am Beagle-Kanal. Institut für Iberoamerika-Kunde, Hamburg 1980, German
 Andrés Cisneros y Carlos Escudé, "Historia general de las Relaciones Exteriores de la República Argentina", Las relaciones con Chile, Cema, Argentina, Buenos Aires. Spanish
 Annegret I. Haffa: Beagle-Konflikt und Falkland (Malwinen)-Krieg. Zur Außenpolitik der Argentinischen Militarregierung 1976–1983. Weltforum Verlag, München/Köln/London 1987, German
 Isaac F. Rojas und Arturo Medrano: Argentina en el Atlántico Chile en el Pacífico. Editorial Nemont, Buenos Aires, Argentina, 1979, Spanish
 Isaac F. Rojas, La Argentina en el Beagle y Atlántico sur 1. Parte. Editorial Diagraf, Buenos Aires, Argentina, Spanish
 Carlos Escudé und Andrés Cisneros: Historia general de las relaciones exteriores de la República Argentina (here), Spanish
 Fabio Vio Valdivieso: La mediación de su S.S. el Papa Juan Pablo II, Editorial Aconcagua, Santiago de Chile, 1984, Spanish
 Alberto Marín Madrid: El arbitraje del Beagle y la actitud Argentina. 1984, Editorial Moisés Garrido Urrea, id = A-1374-84 XIII, Spanish
 Luis Alberto Romero, Argentina in the twentieth Century. Pennsylvania State University Press, translated by James P. Brennan, 1994, 
 Divisionsgeneral (a.D.) Juan E. Gugliamelli: Cuestión del Beagle. Negociación directa o diálogo de armas (Trans.:The Beagle-Question, direct Negotiations or Dialog of the Weapons), in Spanish Language. Book compiled from articles of Argentine Magazin "Estrategia", Buenos Aires Nr:49/50, enero-febrero 1978, erschienen sind.
 General Martín Antonio Balza und Mariano Grondona: Dejo Constancia: memorias de un general argentino. Editorial Planeta, Buenos Aires 2001, Spanish
 Francisco Bulnes Serrano und Patricia Arancibia Clavel: La Escuadra En Acción. Chile, Editorial Grijalbo, 2004, Spanish

External links

 Chilean Telecast of Televisión Nacional de Chile "Informe Especial", Theme El año que vivimos en peligro, (sometimes in YouTube)
 Argentine Telecast of History Channel: Operativo Soberanía, (sometimes in YouTube, Spanish Language
 Special edition of El Mercurio, Santiago de Chile, 2 September 2005, Spanish Language. There are Interviews with contemporary witness like Ernesto Videla, Jaime Del Valle, Helmut Brunner, Marcelo Delpech und Luciano Benjamín Menéndez. Spanish Language.
 Interview with the (later, in the nineties) Chief Commander of the Argentine Army Martín Balza in El Mercurio de Santiago de Chile, 2 September 2005, Spanish Language
 Interview with Sergio Onofre Jarpa, Chile's Ambassador in Argentina 1978 to 1982 in  La Tercera, Santiago, Chile, 17 March 2002,  Spanish Language
 
 
 Interview with the Ambassador of the United States of America in Argentina, Raúl Héctor Castro, in Clarín Buenos Aires, 20 December 1998, Spanish Language
 Interview with the former Chief of the "Secretaría General del Ejército" (a Think-Tank of the Argentine Army), General Reynaldo Bignone, President of Argentina after the Falkland War, in Clarín, Buenos Aires, 20 December 1998, Spanish Language
 Article Cartas desde el Abismo, Clarín, Buenos Aires, 20 December 1998, Spanish Language
 Article El belicismo de los dictadores Clarín, Buenos Aires, 20 December 1998, Spanish Language
 Article Beagle: historia secreta de la guerra que no fue La Nación, Buenos Aires, 12 August 1996, Spanish Language
 Article Historia de la santa mediación'' en Clarín, Buenos Aires, 20 December 1998, Spanish Language
 Chile–Argentina Relations, Spanish Language
 Toma de decisiones políticas y la influencia de los discursos oficialistas durante el Connflicto del Beagle: Chile - Argentina 1977-1979, Spanish Language
 Text of the Tratado de Paz y Amistad de 1984, Dirección de Fronteras y Límites de Chile, Spanish Language
 Text of the Peace and Friendship Treaty of 1984, Copy to the United Nations, English Language

1984 in Argentina
1984 in Chile
Argentina–Chile treaties
Law of Argentina
Beagle conflict
History of Tierra del Fuego
Presidency of Raúl Alfonsín
Treaties concluded in 1984
Treaties entered into force in 1985